The Academia de l'Aragonés (in English, Academy of the Aragonese [Language]) is an organization founded on 15 July 2006 by the 2nd Congress on the Aragonese so as to be the linguistic authority for the Aragonese language. It has no official recognition by the Aragonese government.

The aims of the Academy, according to its statute, are:
Investigate all the oral and written manifestations of the Aragonese language
Gather and update its lexicon
Regulate the Aragonese toponymy and onomastic
Research and formulate spelling, grammar and phonetic rules for all the constitutive dialects
Fix, develop and improve the standard modality
Procure respect for the linguistic rights of Aragonese speakers

Academics 

It has 15 full members and 5 honorary members, and its current (as of 2012) president is Manuel Castán.

See also
Rosario Ustáriz Borra

External links

Official page

News articles 
 
 
 
 
 

Aragonese language